Premolis amaryllis is a moth in the family Erebidae first described by William Schaus in 1905. It is found in French Guiana.

References

Phaegopterina
Moths described in 1905